Christian Marcolli (born 14 March 1973) is a Swiss performance psychologist, executive coach and leadership team consultant, author, and speaker. He is a former professional footballer who played as a striker or midfielder.

Biography

Football career 
Marcolli played his youth football with local club FC Aesch. He advanced to their first team in the 1989–1990 season and received a number of call-ups to the Swiss national teams under 15 to under 21.

After having rejected an offer from the then Swiss Champion Grasshopper Club Zürich, he joined FC Basel's first team during the winter break of their 1990–91 season and signed his first professional contract under head-coach Ernst August Künnecke in the second tier of Swiss football. After playing in four test games, Marcolli played his domestic league debut for his new club in the home game in the St. Jakob Stadium on 3 March 1990 as Basel won 3–1 against Etoile Carouge. He scored his first league goal for his club in the home game on 13 April as Basel were defeated 1–4 by Baden.

Marcolli stayed with the club for two and a half seasons. During this time he played a total of 65 games for Basel scoring a total of 16 goals. 40 of these games were in the Nationalliga A, six in the Swiss Cup and 19 were friendly games. He scored five goals in the domestic league, six in the cup and the other eight were scored during the test games.

Following his time with Basel Marcolli moved on to play one season with BSC Old Boys and then another season with SR Delémont. But severe knee injuries forced him to retire early from professional sports.

Private life 
Marcolli then studied psychology at the University of Basel, Switzerland and sport and performance psychology at the University of Ottawa, Canada. He earned his PhD in Applied psychology from the University of Zurich, Switzerland in 2001.

He is the founder and CEO of Marcolli Executive Excellence, a boutique style consulting company specialized on executives and leadership teams of blue chip companies. In parallel he works as a performance coach with top athletes, having collaborated with Roger Federer, Dominique Gisin, Michelle Gisin, and Yann Sommer.

Books 

 Gisin, Michelle, Christian Marcolli, and Dominique Gisin (2019): A True Athlete. 
Marcolli, Christian (2018): Spotlight on Performance. Executive Inspiration. 
Marcolli, Christian (2017): The Melting Point. How to stay cool and sustain world-class business performance. Urbane Publications, Kent. 
Gisin, Dominique and Christian Marcolli (2015): Making it Happen. Von Engelberg nach Sochi. 
Marcolli, Christian with Tarina Wagschal (2015): More Life, Please! The Performance Pathway to a Better You. Urbane Publications, Kent. 
Marcolli, Christian and Colin H. Sims (2010): Equipping Yourself To Be A Business Champion. Personal Resource Guide. Focus Cross, Elstree. 
Marcolli, Christian and Colin H. Sims (2010): Teach Me Patience, NOW! Equip Yourself To Be A Business Champion. Focus Cross, Elstree. 
Marcolli, Christian (2002): Die psychologische Unterstützung in der Rehabilitation von Verletzungen. Ansätze für medizinische Fachkräfte. GFS-Schriften Sportwissenschaften 24, Zürich. 
Marcolli, Christian (2001): Die psychologische Rehabilitation nach Sportverletzungen. Entwicklung des Interventionsprogramms COMEBACK und Evaluation von dessen Auswirkungen. GFS-Schriften Sportwissenschaften 22, Zürich.

Awards 

 IP Book Award SILVER for "More Life, Please!"

References

Sources
 Die ersten 125 Jahre. Publisher: Josef Zindel im Friedrich Reinhardt Verlag, Basel. 
 Verein "Basler Fussballarchiv" Homepage

1973 births
Living people
Swiss men's footballers
FC Basel players
BSC Old Boys players
SR Delémont players
Association football midfielders
Association football forwards
Swiss Challenge League players
Footballers from Basel